The 2006 Montana Grizzlies football team represented the University of Montana in the 2006 NCAA Division I FCS football season. The Grizzlies were led by fourth-year head coach Bobby Hauck and played their home games on campus at Washington–Grizzly Stadium in Missoula.

Schedule

References

Montana
Montana Grizzlies football seasons
Big Sky Conference football champion seasons
Montana Grizzlies football